Early Recordings from Kansas 1971–1973 is a collection of recordings made by the second edition of Kansas (Proto-Kaw) released in 2002 on Cuneiform Records.  The songs contain numerous nods to the then-burgeoning scene of experimental progressive rock, often echoing the early work of luminaries King Crimson. The tracks "Belexes" and "Incomudro" were later recorded for the Kansas albums Kansas and Song for America, respectively.

Track listing
All tracks by Kerry Livgren

"Hegemonium" – 7:49
"Reunion in the Mountains of Sarne" – 7:47
"Nactolos 21" – 11:38
"Belexes" – 5:11
"Totus Nemesis" – 13:54
"Greek Structure Sunbeam" – 5:42
"Incomudro" – 11:28
"Cyclopy" (live) – 5:46 
"Skont" (live) – 9:39

Musicians
Lynn Meredith – vocals
John Bolton – electric saxophone, flute
Don Montre – piano, flute, alto saxophone
Kerry Livgren – guitars
Dan Wright – hammond organ
Rod Mikinski – bass
Zeke Low – drums
Brad Schulz – drums

Release details
2002, USA, Cuneiform Records Rune 171, Release date 21 October 2002, CD

References

Proto-Kaw albums
2002 albums